Jaroth, Inc. d/b/a Pacific Telemanagement Services is a nationwide operator of payphones in the United States based in San Leandro, California. It was founded in 1984 and has taken over many pay telephone operations that major telephone companies have abandoned.

Many AT&T payphones were sold to PTS in 2008.

Pacific Telemanagement purchased most of the payphone operations of Verizon in October 2011.

FairPoint Communications announced it would sell its payphone business to PTS on May 22, 2012. The sale makes Frontier Communications as one of the last major telecommunications providers continuing to operate payphones. Pacific Telemanagement Services operates approximately 25,000 payphones across the US.

References

External links
PTS Website

Companies based in San Leandro, California
Pay telephone operators of the United States
1984 establishments in California